Capital Repertory Theatre (Capital Rep or theREP) is a 309-seat professional regional theatre in Albany, New York.  Capital Rep is the only theatre in the Capital District that is a member of the League of Resident Theatres (LORT). As a member, it operates under collective bargaining agreements with Actors' Equity Association and other theatre worker unions.

The theatre relocated to its new home at 251 N. Pearl St in Albany, New York in 2021, and is one of three venues affiliated with Proctors Collaborative. 

Artistic staff include Producing Artistic Director Maggie Mancinelli-Cahill, Associate Artistic Director Margaret E. Hall, along with associate artists Gordon Greenberg, Barbara Howard, Stephanie Klapper, Kevin McGuire, Jean-Remy Monnay, Yvonne Perry, Josh D. Smith and Freddy Ramirez.

History
The theatre's predecessor was Lexington Conservatory Theatre in Lexington, New York, founded in 1976 by artistic director Oakley Hall III. In 1978, Hall suffered a traumatic brain injury, ending his career. In 1979, the company announced that it would move to Albany to form a resident theatre called Capital Repertory Company. That winter, LCT produced The Tavern by George M. Cohan at the Egg Theatre in Albany, under the Capital Rep name.In October of 1980, executive director Michael Van Landingham announced that the theatre would not return to Lexington House and instead move permanently to Albany. In December 1980, the group began its first full season at Page Hall in Albany.

Notable Productions
The theatre has produced numerous world premieres, including Dreaming Emmett by Toni Morrison, November by Don Nigro, and Breaking Up Is Hard to Do by Neil Sedaka.

Mission
According to the website, the mission of Capital Rep is "to create a meaningful theatre generated from an authentic link to the community."

Awards
 Theatre Communications Group Playwright in Residence Award (1997)
 American Marketing Association Mark of Excellence Award (1996)
 Pew Charitable Trust National Theatre Artist Residency Program Award (1993)
 Kennedy Center Fund for New American Play Award (1988 & 1992)
 Foundation of the Dramatists Guild/CBS Awards (1984, 1986 & 1987)
 Business Committee for the Arts First Place National Award (1984)
 Outstanding New Enterprise - Albany/Colonie Regional Chamber of Commerce (1983)

2009-2010 season
Shear Madness by Paul Portner
The Seafarer by Conor McPherson
My Fair Lady by Alan Lerner and Frederick Loewe
Betrayal by Harold Pinter
To Kill a Mockingbird by Harper Lee

2013-2014 season
The Sparkley Clean Funeral Singers by Lori Fischer
Venus in Fur by David Ives
A Christmas Carol adapted by Patrick Barlow
The Mountaintop by Katori Hall
Gypsy by Arthur Laurents
The God Game by Suzanne Bradbeer

See also
Lexington Conservatory Theatre
League of Resident Theatres
Regional Theatre
Capital District

References

External links
 Official Website

Buildings and structures in Albany, New York
Theatres in New York (state)
Tourist attractions in Albany, New York